Southeastern Grocers (formerly Bi-Lo Holdings) is a supermarket portfolio headquartered in Jacksonville, Florida. The portfolio was created by Lone Star Funds in September 2013 as the new parent company for Harveys, Winn-Dixie, and Fresco y Más. Southeastern Grocers was rated #31 in the Forbes 2015 ranking of America's Largest Private Companies. In February 2017, Anthony Hucker was appointed as President and CEO of Southeastern Grocers.

History
On March 21, 2007, Lone Star Funds announced the corporate spin-off of the 67 Bruno's Supermarkets and Food World stores from BI-LO LLC into a separate company to be based out of Birmingham. On April 16, 2007, Lone Star announced that it was putting the 230-store BI-LO chain up for sale. Soon after, C&S announced that it was closing the Chattanooga distribution center that served the BI-LOs in the Chattanooga area and portions of North Georgia.

On March 23, 2009, BI-LO announced that it had filed chapter 11 bankruptcy and intended to use the court-supervised process to address "an upcoming debt maturity." The company said that expects its stores and regular operations to continue to operate as usual during the process. The company secured a $100 million loan from GE Capital in order to continue paying wages, salaries, benefits, suppliers, and vendors. In October 2009, Delhaize Group, headquartered in Belgium and owner of competing chain Food Lion, announced that it entered a preliminary, non-binding agreement to purchase $425 million worth of assets from the chain. Shortly after, in November 2009, the company filed plans with the U.S. Bankruptcy Court to restructure, with parent company Lone Star Funds providing a $350 million cash infusion, and Delhaize Group and Food Lion left out of the plans. Lone Star Funds said that it was possible that BI-LO could emerge from bankruptcy in the first quarter of 2010.

On May 12, 2010, the company emerged from bankruptcy protection, under a plan approved by the U.S. Bankruptcy Court, District of South Carolina. BI-LO remains under ownership of Lone Star Funds after restructuring. BI-LO was reportedly put up for sale in August 2010; Kroger and Publix were said to be interested in acquiring the chain, but nothing developed from these rumors.

In September 2013, Southeastern Grocers was created by Lone Star Funds as the new parent company for BI-LO, Harveys, and Winn-Dixie. The new parent company then filed to raise as much as $500 million in a U.S. initial public offering and list its common stock under the "SEG" symbol. On August 19, 2014 Southeastern Grocers withdrew their IPO filing with the SEC, aborting the process of listing the stock for public sale.

In July 2015, Southeastern Grocers announced the sale of its 21 BI-LO locations in the Chattanooga, Tennessee market as well as eight BI-LO locations in Northern Georgia to K-VA-T Food Stores, which would rebrand the stores under its Food City banner. Southeastern Grocers would likely use proceeds from the deal to reduce debt. That effectively ended Southeastern Grocers' presence in the Tennessee market.

In October 2015, Southeastern Grocers laid off 250 workers at its support offices in a move said to improve efficiency and invest in service and value for customers. The cuts took place at Southeastern's Jacksonville, Florida headquarters and regional support centers. Store employees were not affected.

In June 2016, Southeastern Grocers converted a Winn-Dixie location in Hialeah, Florida to Fresco y Más, which features an expanded Hispanic product assortment, a full-service Latin butcher shop, and Cocina. In December 2016, an additional five South Florida Winn-Dixie locations in Miami-Dade and Palm Beach counties were converted to the Fresco y Más banner. In March 2017, Southeastern converted another 5 South Florida Winn-Dixie locations throughout Miami and Hialeah, Florida to the Fresco y Más brand. In celebration of Fresco y Más' first anniversary in June 2017, another 7 Winn-Dixie locations were converted in Miami, Hialeah, and Hollywood, Florida, include the banner's first Broward County store, to bring the total number of Fresco y Más supermarkets to 18.

In May 2017, Southeastern Grocers announced the closing of 23 locations along with the elimination of some department lead roles at stores.

In June 2017, Southeastern announced that President and CEO Ian McLeod was leaving the company to pursue another opportunity. On August 10, 2017, Southeastern Grocers announced that it had appointed Anthony Hucker as President and CEO, effective immediately. Anthony, who had joined Southeastern Grocers in February 2016, had served as Interim President and CEO since July 1, 2017, following McLeod's departure.

In February 2019, Southeastern announced plans to shutter 22 locations in Florida, Georgia, North Carolina, and South Carolina. This round of closures included 13 BI-LO locations, 7 Winn-Dixie locations and 2 Harveys Supermarkets.

Elimination of the BI-LO banner

On June 9, 2020, Southeastern Grocers announced the decision to no longer operate stores under the BI-LO banner. As part of an effort to reach that goal, Southeastern reached an agreement to sell 62 stores, including 46 BI-LO and 16 Harveys Supermarkets, to Ahold Delhaize subsidiary Food Lion. As part of the agreement, they will also be transitioning their Mauldin, South Carolina distribution center over to Ahold Delhaize USA Distribution, LLC. Both of these closed in the first half of 2021, at which point over 60 stores began to transition to the Food Lion banner.  Following the announcement, Food Lion purchased additional stores in to 2021 located in North and South Carolina that were scheduled to close, acquiring roughly 70 stores total from Southeastern Grocers.

In addition, as part of the same announcement, Southeastern announced they will be divesting the assets of 57 of the in-store pharmacies it operates under the BI-LO and Harveys Supermarket banners to CVS Pharmacy and Walgreens. These locations include all of the company's BI-LO pharmacies and nine Harveys Supermarket pharmacies in Georgia. The transition is expected to begin within two weeks of the press release date.

On September 1, 2020, it was announced that Southeastern Grocers was selling 20 BI-LO stores in South Carolina and Georgia to Alex Lee, Inc who would rebrand the stores as KJ'S Market IGA and Lowes Foods. In the same announcement, 2 additional BI-LO and one Harvey's Supermarket location in South Carolina would be sold to independent operator B&T Foods. Following the sale, BI-LO will have 39 stores remaining in Georgia, North Carolina and South Carolina.

On December 21, 2020, two independent Piggly Wiggly owners, with support from C&S Wholesale Grocers, announced plans to acquire one BI-LO supermarket in South Carolina and another in Georgia from Southeastern Grocers. Both locations were previously Piggly Wiggly stores that were acquired by SEG in 2013.

The stores that were not sold to any other operators were closed on or by April 18, 2021, ending the 60 year run of the BI-LO banner.

2018 bankruptcy
In February 2018, it was announced that Southeastern Grocers was selling eight Winn-Dixie locations in south Louisiana to Texas-based Brookshire Grocery Company as well as an additional three Mississippi and four New Orleans market locations to Baton Rouge-based Shoppers Value Foods.

On March 15, 2018, Southeastern Grocers announced they would file a plan of reorganization under Chapter 11 by the end of March. According to the company, the restructuring would decrease overall debt levels by over $500 million. Under this plan, 94 stores across the BI-LO, Fresco y Más, Harveys, and Winn-Dixie brands would close.

On March 28, 2018, Southeastern agreed to sell three BI-LO locations in South Carolina along with three Harveys locations in Georgia to three independent Piggly Wiggly store owners. An additional three Winn-Dixie stores in northeast Alabama would also be sold to wholesaler Mitchell Grocery Corp on behalf of two of its current customers, Johnson's Giant Foods and The D'Alessandro Organization LLC, while the Winn-Dixie location in Atmore, Alabama was being acquired by Ramey's. The deals are in conjunction with the restructuring support agreement revealed by Southeastern Grocers. On April 27, 2018, Food Lion announced plans to acquire four BI-LO locations in Florence, South Carolina, Myrtle Beach, South Carolina, Surfside Beach, South Carolina, and Columbia, South Carolina. The week of April 30, 2018, Publix announced they would acquire the lease, fixtures, equipment, permits, and licenses for the Seneca, South Carolina BI-LO location that was slated to close, while an independent Piggly Wiggly operator announced that they would reopen the Montgomery, Alabama Winn-Dixie location that closed. Both location were part of the original restructuring plan to close 94 stores. Two of the BI-LO locations originally closed as part of the bankruptcy reorganization in April 2018, Ladson and Mullins, South Carolina, were acquired by another independent Piggly Wiggly owner and would be reopened in June 2018.

In May 2018, Southeastern Grocers restructuring plan was confirmed by a U.S. Bankruptcy judge in Delaware. At the end of that month, Southeastern Grocers announced that it had completed its financial restructuring and was emerging from bankruptcy. As part of the restructuring, $522 million in debt was exchanged for equity in Southeastern Grocers, though it was not announced who was receiving the equity shares. Southeastern Grocers exited bankruptcy with 575 stores in seven states, down from 704 locations. They also announced a planned remodels of 100 stores in 2018.

Mergers and acquisitions

Winn-Dixie
On December 19, 2011, it was announced that BI-LO and Winn-Dixie would merge to create an organization with some 690 grocery stores and 63,000 employees in eight states throughout the southeastern United States. BI-LO purchased Winn-Dixie for US$530 million, and operates Winn-Dixie as a subsidiary with those stores maintaining the Winn-Dixie name. The merged company is based at Winn-Dixie's former headquarters in Jacksonville, Florida. In early 2013, BI-LO phased out its own private label soft drinks in its BI-LO stores in favor of the "Chek" brand used by Winn-Dixie.

Delhaize Group
On May 28, 2013, it was announced that BI-LO was acquiring the Harveys, Sweetbay, and Reid's banners from Delhaize Group for $265 million. Upon completion of the transaction, BI-LO rebranded all Sweetbay stores as Winn-Dixie stores, and all Reid's stores as BI-LO stores, while keeping the Harveys name for those stores.

Piggly Wiggly Carolina Stores 
In September 2013, Southeastern Grocers announced an agreement to buy 22 supermarkets in South Carolina and Georgia from the Piggly Wiggly Carolina Co. Inc. for $35 million. One Piggly Wiggly store in Lexington, South Carolina was closed due to close proximity to other BI-LO stores.

Also in September 2013, BI-LO entered into an agreement to sell 7 BI-LO branded stores in the Charlotte market to Publix: the stores are located in Charlotte, NC, Huntersville, NC, Matthews, NC, Lake Wylie, SC, and Rock Hill, SC.

Store locations

 Winn Dixie (Alabama, Florida, Georgia, Louisiana, Mississippi)
 Harveys (Florida, Georgia)
 Fresco y Más (Florida)

References

External links

 Southeastern Grocers Official website

Companies based in South Carolina
Companies based in Jacksonville, Florida
Economy of the Southeastern United States
Supermarkets of the United States
Private equity portfolio companies
Companies that filed for Chapter 11 bankruptcy in 2018
Retail companies established in 2013